Ivan Cornejo (born in 2004 in Riverside, California), is an American regional Mexican music singer-songwriter. Cornejo endured a breakup in middle school that provided inspiration for songwriting. He taught himself how to play the guitar by watching tutorials on YouTube. The first song he learned how to play was "La Bamba" by Ritchie Valens.

Cornejo's debut album Alma Vacia peaked at number two on the US Billboard Regional Mexican Albums chart and number seven on the Top Latin Albums chart. The album sold 6,000 album-equivalent units and peaked at number 156 on the Billboard 200 chart, and remained in the top ten of the Regional Mexican Albums chart for 35 weeks. His songwriting credits enabled him to peak atop the Billboard Latin Songwriters chart on the week ending October 30, 2021. Alma Vacia was named as one of the best albums of 2021 by The New York Times. The single "Está Dañada", went viral on TikTok in September 2021. It peaked at number 61 on the Billboard Hot 100 chart, the second regional Mexican song to chart on the Hot 100. Billboard magazine included Cornejo in their Artist on the Rise column in October 2021.

His second studio album Dañado, debuted and peaked at number one on the Regional Mexican Albums chart in the week ending June 18, 2022. The album sold 8,000 album-equivalent units, with 11.9 million on-demand streams of the album's songs, while it peaked at number four on the Top Latin Albums chart. Dañado provided Manzana Records with their first number-one album credit. The album also peaked at number 28 on the Billboard 200 chart. Cornejo has been nominated for New Regional Mexican Artist at the 2022 Premios Juventud. His music inspirations included T3R Elemento and Grupo Los De La O. Cornejo's guitar solos in his songs include alternative rock influences, a genre his brother and mother often listened to during Cornejo's upbringing.

Accolades

References

Works cited 

2004 births
American mariachi musicians
American musicians of Mexican descent
Hispanic and Latino American singers
People from Riverside, California
Singers from California
Spanish-language singers of the United States
Regional Mexican musicians
21st-century American singers
Living people